Lozotaenia retiana is a species of moth of the family Tortricidae. It is found on Sardinia.

The wingspan is 22–24 mm. Adults are on wing in August and September.

References

	

Moths described in 1913
Archipini